Women & Songs 7 is the seventh album in the Women & Songs franchise.

Overview
The album was released on November 25, 2003.  18 tracks are featured, which are opened by the Faith Hill hit Cry.

The album reached #7 on the Top Canadian Albums chart.  This was down from the #5 showing two years earlier, and a drop of 5 spots since the 1998 peak of the second album at #2.

Track listing
 "Cry" (Angie Aparo) [3:47]
(performed by Faith Hill)
 "Intuition" (Jewel Kilcher/Lester Mendez) [3:49]
(performed by Jewel)
 "Julia" (Chantal Kreviazuk/John O'Brien) [3:41]
(performed by Chantal Kreviazuk)
 "Why Can't I?" (Lauren Christy/Graham Edwards/Liz Phair/Scott Spoc) [3:26]
(performed by Liz Phair)
 "Love Is the Only Soldier" (Russell Broom/Jann Arden Richards) [3:51]
(performed by Jann Arden)
 "Are You Happy Now" (Michelle Branch/John Shanks) [3:50]
(performed by Michelle Branch)
 "Don't Worry" (Natalie Appleton/Craigie K. Dodds/Damien Hastings) [4:44]
(performed by Appleton)
 "Surrendering" (Alanis Morissette) [4:38]
(performed by Alanis Morissette)
 "Sweet Surrender" (Sarah McLachlan) [4:01]
(performed by Sarah McLachlan)
 "Lights Out" (Glen Ballard/Clif Magness/Lisa Marie Presley) [3:41]
(performed by Lisa Marie Presley)
 "What You Never Know" (Stephan Moccio) [3:23]
(performed by Sarah Brightman)
 "It's About Time" (Louise Burns/Lauren Christy/Graham Edwards/Lacey-Lee Evin/Tasha-Ray Evin/Scott Spock) [3:42]
(performed by Lillix)
 "Officially Missing You" (Seven Aurelius) [4:02]
(performed by Tamia)
 "Look Who's Crying Now" (Rosanna Ciciola/Tino Izzo) [4:07]
(performed by Jacynthe)
 "I Traveled" (Jully Black/Mack, Karriem/Newsome, Jermaine/Lashaun Owens) [4:33]
(performed by Jully Black)
 "For What It's Worth" (Nina Persson/Peter Svensson) [4:17]
(performed by The Cardigans)
 "Over My Head" (Bryan Adams/Dave Pickell) [4:29]
(performed by Sherrie Lea)
 "That's What Happens" (Courtney Farquhar) [3:39]
(performed by Courtney Farquhar)

References
 [ Women & Songs 7 at AllMusic]

2003 compilation albums